Subandrio (15 September 1914 – 3 July 2004) was an Indonesian politician and Foreign Minister and First Deputy Prime Minister of Indonesia under President Sukarno. Removed from office following the failed 1965 coup, he spent 29 years in prison.

The spelling "Subandrio" has been official in Indonesia since 1947 but the older spelling Soebandrio is still sometimes used.

Early career

Subandrio was born in Malang, East Java, and educated at the Sekolah Tinggi Kedokteran Jakarta (GHS) in Jakarta. As a medical student he was active in the movement for independence. During World War II, while practicing medicine, he worked with anti-Japanese resistance forces. His wife, Hurustiati Subandrio, was also a politically active medical doctor. After the war he was appointed secretary-general of the information ministry.

After 1945 Subandrio became a supporter of the nationalist leader Sukarno, and was sent as Sukarno's special envoy in Europe, establishing an information office in London in 1947. From 1954 to 1956, he was ambassador to the Soviet Union. During this time he developed strong left wing views, although he was never a Communist as later alleged.

Cabinet minister
In 1956 Sukarno recalled him to Jakarta to become secretary-general of the foreign ministry, and then Foreign Minister. In 1960 he was also made Second Deputy Prime Minister, and in 1962 he was appointed Minister for Foreign Economic Relations. He held all three posts, and also acted as intelligence chief, until 1966.

Subandrio was the main architect of Indonesia's left-wing foreign policy during this period, including the alliance with the People's Republic of China and the policy of "Confrontation" with Malaysia, which created great hostility between Indonesia and the western powers, particularly the United States and the United Kingdom. He was heavily involved in the Sunda Straits Crisis of 1964, when the British aircraft carrier HMS Victorious passed through Indonesian waters without proper approval.

Downfall of Sukarno
On 30 September 1965 a group of army officers, allegedly supported by the powerful Communist Party of Indonesia (PKI), attacked a part of the Army leadership that was supposedly plotting to overthrow Sukarno. Six Army generals were killed but the alleged "coup attempt" failed. In the resulting anti-Communist backlash the conservative General Suharto took control of the government. Sukarno tried to retain Subandrio in the cabinet, but in 1966 he was forced to agree to his dismissal.

Subandrio was sentenced to death by the Extraordinary Military Court on charges of being involved in the "30 September Movement," although there was no real evidence that Subandrio knew of the plot in advance or played any part in it (he was in Sumatra at the time). This sentence was afterwards reduced to life imprisonment upon the request of the British government on behalf of Queen Elizabeth, as it was remembered that Subandrio was Indonesia's first envoy to the U.K. He remained in prison until 1995, when he was released due to ill health. He died in Jakarta in 2004.

References

Further reading
 Segeh, Sjafri.(1966) Soebandrio, Durno terbesar abad ke-XX Padang : Trimuf. (In Indonesian)
 Subandrio, Dr.(1957) Indonesia in the United Nations : speech by the Minister for Foreign Affairs, Dr. Soebandrio ... Djakarta : Ministry of Information, Republic. From the general debate of the 12th regular session of the General Assembly of the United Nations, Thursday, 3 October 1957.
 Soebandrio, Dr. H. (2006) Yang saya alami : peristiwa G 30 S: sebelum, saat meletus dan sesudahnya penyunting, Mohamad Achadi, Soebagio Anam, Dra. Uchikowati.Jakarta : Bumi Intitama Sejahtera.   (In Indonesian)
 Subandrio, Dr. H. (2001) Kesaksianku tentang G-30-S Jakarta : Forum Pendukung Reformasi Total.

1914 births
2004 deaths
People from Malang
Indonesian Muslims
Government ministers of Indonesia
Foreign ministers of Indonesia
Indonesian prisoners and detainees
Prisoners and detainees of Indonesia
Ambassadors of Indonesia to the Soviet Union
Ambassadors of Indonesia to the United Kingdom
Grand Crosses 1st class of the Order of Merit of the Federal Republic of Germany